How I Met Your Father is an American sitcom created by Isaac Aptaker and Elizabeth Berger that premiered on Hulu on January 18, 2022. It is a spin-off of How I Met Your Mother. The series, which stars Hilary Duff, Christopher Lowell, Francia Raisa, Suraj Sharma, Tom Ainsley, Tien Tran, and Kim Cattrall, follows the main character, Sophie (Duff), and her group of friends in Manhattan. As a framing device, Sophie (Cattrall), in the year 2050, recounts to her unseen son the events that followed meeting his father in January 2022, and how they ultimately had him. In February 2022, the series was renewed for a second season, which premiered on January 24, 2023.

Cast and characters

Main 

 Hilary Duff as Sophie, a hopelessly romantic photographer who is looking for her soulmate. Though believing in true love, she is unaware of her biological father due to her mother having slept with random men.
 Christopher Lowell as Jesse, an aspiring musician who works as an Uber driver and music teacher, who has become an internet meme after being left by his ex-girlfriend Meredith after a failed marriage proposal. He lives with Sid in Ted, Marshall and Lily's old apartment.
 Francia Raisa as Valentina, an impulsive assistant-stylist who is also Sophie's best friend and roommate and Charlie's love interest.
 Suraj Sharma as Sid, Jesse's best friend and roommate who owns a bar. He is introduced as engaged to his long-distance girlfriend Hannah.
 Tom Ainsley as Charlie, a British aristocrat who abandons his inheritance to follow his love interest Valentina to New York after meeting her at London Fashion Week. He later moves in with Ellen and the two become roommates, before being hired by Sid as a bartender.
 Tien Tran as Ellen, Jesse's adoptive sister who moves to New York City to find romance after her divorce from her wife. She owns a produce farm.
 Kim Cattrall as future Sophie, who in the year 2050 tells her son the story of how she met his father.

Recurring 

 Daniel Augustin as Ian, Sophie's Tinder date. He is a marine biologist who moves to Australia in the pilot episode, but returns to New York in the season 1 finale.
 Ashley Reyes as Hannah, Sid's longtime girlfriend to whom he gets engaged in the pilot. She works as a surgeon in Los Angeles, and later elopes with Sid in the season 1 finale after learning that her fellowship has been extended.
 Leighton Meester as Meredith, Jesse's ex-girlfriend who publicly rejected his marriage proposal
 Josh Peck as Drew, the vice principal at the school where Jesse teaches music lessons and Sophie's boyfriend for most of season 1
 Aby James as Rachel, a new neighbor in Charlie and Ellen's apartment building and Ellen's love interest
 Meaghan Rath as Parker (season 2), Jesse's co-worker
In addition, Stony Blyden co-stars as Jasper, a bartender at Sid's bar, though he has so far only appeared in season 1.

Notable guest stars 
 Paget Brewster as Lori, Sophie's mother, a notorious party girl who had Sophie when she was young
 Dan Bucatinsky as Fred, Valentina's boss
 Michael Barbaro as himself
 Kyle MacLachlan as The Captain
 Laura Bell Bundy as Becky, the Captain's third wife who eventually leaves him
 Cobie Smulders as Robin Scherbatsky, a news reporter whom Sophie encounters
 Neil Patrick Harris as Barney Stinson
 Meghan Trainor as Ramona, Sophie's neighbor
 Mark Consuelos as Juan, Valentina's father
 Constance Marie as Raquel, Valentina's mother
 Alexis Denisof as Sandy Rivers, a perverted newsman who interviews Meredith and Jesse
 Judge Judy Sheindlin as herself

Episodes

Series overview

Season 1 (2022)

Season 2 (2023)

Production

Development 
Following the production of the 2014 CBS pilot How I Met Your Dad, which did not move forward, on December 14, 2016, it was reported that Isaac Aptaker and Elizabeth Berger were set to write a new version of the previous spin-off's pilot, re-titled How I Met Your Father, with Carter Bays and Craig Thomas serving as executive producers. It was later announced that, after signing new contracts with 20th Century Fox Television that would see both Aptaker and Berger being promoted to executive producers and co-showrunners on This Is Us alongside Dan Fogelman, the idea would be put on hold until further notice.

On August 8, 2017, Fox chairman Dana Walden told Deadline Hollywood that 20th Television were attempting a spin-off with different writers, for the third time. Three days following the announcement, Deadline reported that Alison Bennett would write the spin-off, with the same title as the previous attempt with Aptaker and Berger. It was also learned that Bays and Thomas were once again hired as executive producers. This attempt also fell through.

On April 21, 2021, the spin-off series titled How I Met Your Father was given a 10-episode series order by Hulu. Aptaker and Berger will serve as creators, writers, and executive producers while Hilary Duff serves as a producer. 20th Television is involved with producing the series. On June 24, 2021, Pamela Fryman joined the series as an executive producer and to direct the pilot. On February 15, 2022, Hulu renewed the series for a 20-episode second season.

Casting 
Upon series order announcement, Hilary Duff was cast to star. On June 16, 2021, Chris Lowell joined the cast as the male lead. In August 2021, Francia Raisa, Tom Ainsley, Tien Tran, and Suraj Sharma were cast in starring roles while Brandon Micheal Hall was cast in a recurring role. However, a few weeks later, Hall exited the role due to a scheduling conflict and Daniel Augustin was cast to replace Hall. The next day, Josh Peck and Ashley Reyes joined the cast in recurring roles. On November 5, 2021, Kim Cattrall was cast in a recurring role as the future version of Duff's character Sophie. Upon the series premiere, it was reported that Leighton Meester is set to recur. On February 3, 2022, it was announced that Paget Brewster was cast to guest star on the episode,"The Good Mom", which aired on February 8, 2022. On January 18, 2023, Meaghan Rath was cast in a recurring capacity for the second season.

Filming 
Principal photography for the series began on August 31, 2021.

Release 
How I Met Your Father premiered on Hulu on January 18, 2022. Internationally, the show began streaming on Disney+ via Star and in Latin America on Star+ on March 9, 2022. The second season premiered on January 24, 2023, on Hulu.

Reception

Audience viewership 
According to Parrot Analytics, which looks at consumer engagement in consumer research, streaming, downloads, and on social media, How I Met Your Father was the fifth most in-demand new show, during the week of March 12, 2022, to March 18, 2022. According to Whip Media's TV Time, How I Met Your Father was the 5th most watched original series across all platforms in the United States, during the week of January 23, 2022, as well during the week of January 30, 2022, the 8th during the week of February 13, 2022, the 4th during the week of March 13, 2022, and the 3rd during the week of March 20, 2022.

According to Whip Media's TV Time, How I Met Your Father was the most watched original series across all platforms in the United States, during the week of January 29, 2023, as well during the week of February 5, 2023, the 2nd during the week of February 12, 2023, the 3rd during the week of February 19, 2023, the 2nd during the week of February 26, 2023, the 2nd during the week of March 5, 2023, the 3rd during the week of March 12, 2023.

Critical response 
The review aggregator website Rotten Tomatoes reported a 38% approval rating with an average rating of 5/10, based on 45 critic reviews. The website's critics consensus reads, "How I Met Your Father takes great pains to update its predecessor's formula for a modern audience, but this stilted retread only amounts to a painful slog." Metacritic, which uses a weighted average, assigned a score of 49 out of 100 based on 19 critics, indicating "mixed or average reviews."

Accolades

Notes

References

External links 

 
 

2020s American sitcoms
2022 American television series debuts
American sequel television series
American television spin-offs
English-language television shows
How I Met Your Mother
Hulu original programming
Primetime Emmy Award-winning television series
Productions using StageCraft
Television series by 20th Century Fox Television
Television series set in the 2020s
Television series set in the 2050s